Erdželija is a village in the municipality of Sveti Nikole, North Macedonia.

Demographics
On the 1927 ethnic map of Leonhard Schulze-Jena, the village is written as "Erdželi" and shown as a Bulgarian Christian village. According to the 2002 census, the village had a total of 1,012 inhabitants. Ethnic groups in the village include:

Macedonians 979
Aromanians 31
Others 2

References

Villages in Sveti Nikole Municipality